Anban may refer to:

Anban, a utensil used in Korean cooking
Anban (film), an Indian film made in 1944
, a Panamanian cargo ship in service 1964-65